Acanthurus nubilus is an herbivorous tropical fish also known as the bluelined surgeon or the pin-striped surgeon. It was first named by Fowler and Bean in 1929, and despite being a rare species, is used in aquariums.

References

Acanthuridae
Acanthurus
Fish described in 1929